Rosario Di Bella (born 27 July 1963) is an Italian composer, singer-songwriter, music arranger and musician.

Background 
Born in Zafferana Etnea, Catania, Di Bella studied piano and medicine at the University of Catania. After a long period spent traveling around the world  and playing with groups and formations from different backgrounds, in 1987 Di Bella participated at the Castrocaro Music Festival, winning the competition with the song "Sono interessante". The first album, Pittore Di Me Stesso, was released in 1989, obtaining good reviews from critics.

In 1991 he debuted at the Sanremo Music Festival, as a member of a trio consisting of himself, Marco Conidi and Bungaro; their song "E noi qui" was a commercial success.  He came back in Sanremo Festival as a soloist two years later, with the song "E io che non volevo". In 1995 Di Bella got his major commercial success with the song "Difficile amarsi". Since 2001 Di Bella focused on composing, writing among others for Paolo Meneguzzi and Patty Pravo.

Discography  
 1989 - Pittore di me stesso
 1991 - Figlio perfetto
 1995 - Esperanto
 2000 - I miei amici
 2001 - Rosario Di Bella (collection)
 2004 - Made in Italy (collection)
 2007 - Il negozio della solitudine
 2016 - Spirituality (in couple with Juri Camisasca)

References

External links
 

 

1963 births
Living people
People from Zafferana Etnea
Italian singer-songwriters
Italian pop singers
Italian composers
Italian male composers
Italian music arrangers
Musicians from the Province of Catania